Arthur Stewart may refer to:

 Tom Stewart (politician) (Arthur Thomas Stewart, 1892–1972), Democratic United States Senator from Tennessee
 Arthur Stewart, Duke of Rothesay (1509–1510), second son of James IV of Scotland and Margaret Tudor
 Arthur Stewart, Duke of Albany (1541–1541), second son of James V of Scotland and Mary of Guise
 Arthur Stewart (footballer) (1942–2018), Northern Ireland former international footballer
 Arthur Dudley Stewart (1877–1948), British missionary to Hong Kong
Art Stewart (1927–2021), baseball player
 Art Stewart (producer) (died 2021), Motown Records producer and engineer

See also
Arthur Stuart (disambiguation)